Parliamentary elections were held in Niger on 23 November 1996. They followed the constitutional changes approved in a referendum earlier in the year, which re-introduced multi-party democracy suspended by an earlier military coup. However, the eight main opposition parties boycotted the elections after forming the Front for the Restoration and Defence of Democracy. The result was a victory for the National Union of Independents for Democratic Renewal, which won 59 of the 83 seats, three of which were won in by-elections after the original result had been invalidated by the Supreme Court.

Results

References

Niger
1996 in Niger
Elections in Niger
Election and referendum articles with incomplete results